José Alfredo Holtreman Roquette (10 October 1885 – 19 October 1918), better known as José Alvalade, was the founder and first club member of Sporting CP in the early twentieth century, along with the brothers Stromp, Henrique de Almeida Leite Junior and the Gavazzo brothers.  His grandfather, Viscount of Alvalade took charge as club’s president. Later, José would become Sporting’s 3rd president from 1910 to 1912.

Biography
He was born into aristocracy, his maternal grandfather being Alfredo Augusto das Neves Holtreman, 1st Viscount of Alvalade. Interested in sport from a young age, José was part of a sports association known as Campo Grande Football Club. Despite the name, this association was particularly active in the organization of parties and dances.

He studied medicine at Harvard Medical School for 3 years, eventually giving up his profession because he said he was too sensitive to deal with blood and death.

Sporting CP
On April 1906, José Alvalade expressed the intention to form a new club, with the support of several members of Campo Grande Football Club and the financial help of his grandfather, the Viscount of Alvalade, who oversaw the creation of the new club and made the grounds available for the construction of the stadium at his Quinta das Mouras, that covered the current areas of Lumiar, Campo Grande and Alvalade in Lisbon.

With the financial and logistical support of the Viscount of Alvalade, who was the first president, Sporting CP was founded on 1 July 1906. José Alvalade, founder of the club, was the first club member, being the vice-president and manager of sports. He was also a football, cricket and tennis player. In June 1910 he was named president, the club's third president until then, a position he held until November 1912. Two years later, he left the institution because of disagreements with members of the board of directors.

During the founding period, José Alvalade had the desire to make Sporting a "great club, as big as the biggest in Europe". Guided by the aspiration to open the way to sport in Portugal, when it was still an embryonic stage of development, and with very elitist characteristics, the first "sportinguistas" founded Sporting Clube de Portugal, pursuing the ideals of "Effort, Dedication, Devotion and Glory."

In 1947, after a General Assembly, it was decided that the stadium should adopt its current name, Estádio José Alvalade, in his honor, a name that was maintained by statutory imposition, in the stadiums inaugurated on 10 June 1956 and 6 August 2003.

José Alvalade died at the age of 33, on 19 October 1918, a victim of the pneumonic epidemic.

References

Sporting CP presidents
1885 births
1918 deaths
Deaths from the Spanish flu pandemic in Portugal
Portuguese people of Italian descent